The molecular formula C23H38O4 (molar mass: 378.54 g/mol, exact mass: 378.2770 u) may refer to:

 Apocholic acid 
 2-Arachidonoylglycerol (2-AG)

Molecular formulas